The L Magazine was a free bi-weekly magazine in New York City featuring investigative articles, arts and culture commentary, and event listings. It was available through distribution in Manhattan, Brooklyn, Queens, and Hoboken.

History
The L Magazine was created in 2003 by brothers Scott and Daniel Stedman and editor Jonny Diamond in Dumbo, Brooklyn. The brothers named it for the L train, a subway line that connects Brooklyn to Manhattan. It ceased publication in July 2015, with resources shifted to sister publication Brooklyn Magazine.

The Boxing Match

The L's launch coincided with that of New York Sports Express, an offshoot of New York Press. The distribution boxes used by Express and The L looked very similar; both were bright orange, and they were the same shape and color.

While most likely a coincidence, Express editor-in-chief Jeff Koyen decided to print a series of barbs  against Scott Stedman, The L's publisher. Stedman responded with a full-sized ad in The L challenging Koyen to a boxing match. On October 25, Koyen and Stedman boxed at Gleason's Gym in Dumbo, Brooklyn to settle the score. The match ended in a draw, and no re-match was re-scheduled.

The boxing match was re-created on the TV show Bored to Death.  Jonathan Ames claims in his blog that the season finale was based on this match.

Events
In 2005, The L Magazine launched Summer Screen, a free weekly film series in Brooklyn's McCarren Park.

In 2009, The L Magazine launched the Northside Music Festival.  Headliners included indie rock acts Cymbals Eat Guitars, The Dodos, Screaming Females, and Real Estate (band). In 2010, The L Magazine hosted the second Northside Festival, featuring performances by Polvo, Liars (band), Elvis Perkins in Dearland, and The Fiery Furnaces.  The festival also hosted the films Feast of Stephen by James Franco and Life During Wartime by Todd Solondz.

Awards
In November 2010, The L Magazine art critic Paddy Johnson was nominated for Art Critic of the Year in the Rob Pruitt Art Awards

Sources

External links

Biweekly magazines published in the United States
Defunct magazines published in the United States
Free magazines
Listings magazines
Magazines established in 2003
Magazines disestablished in 2015
Magazines published in New York City
Visual arts magazines published in the United States